The Škoda Octavia WRC is a World Rally Car built for the Škoda Motorsport by Škoda Auto in the World Rally Championship. It is based upon the Škoda Octavia road car, and was debuted at the 1999 Monte Carlo Rally.

Competition history

In its four years service in the Škoda works team, the car achieved two stage wins and a podium finish at the 2001 Safari Rally. The car was replaced by Škoda Fabia WRC in middle of the 2003 season.

Gallery

References

External links
  

Octavia WRC
All-wheel-drive vehicles
Cars of the Czech Republic
World Rally Cars